Ju Wenpei (born 6 September 1975) is a Chinese actress, composer and hostess.

She is noted for her roles as Xia Tian and Da Wa in the films Set Off (2008) and A Tibetan Love Song (2010) respectively.

Life

Early life
Ju was born and raised in Chongqing. She entered Shanghai Conservatory of Music in 1985, majoring in music, where she graduated in 1999.

Career
After graduation, Ju became a hostess in ShangHai Education Television Station. Ju transferred to China Central Television in June 2001, she hosted the World Film Report.

Ju's first film role was uncredited appearance in the film No Dream Year (2007).

In 2008, Ju acted in Set Off, she received Macau International Movie Festival nomination for Best Best New Artist. The film also screened at the 2009 Tokyo International Film Festival and Shanghai University Student Film Festival.

Zhu's first major film role was as Da Wa in A Tibetan Love Song, she won the Best Actress Award at the Chinese American Film Festival, and was nominated for Macau International Movie Festival - Best Actress.

In 2011, Ju won the Golden Phoenix Award.

In 2012, Ju participated in Deng Enming's Childhood,  for which she received Best Supporting Actress Award nomination at the Macau International Movie Festival.

Filmography

Film

Television

Awards

References

External links

1975 births
Living people
Actresses from Chongqing
Shanghai Conservatory of Music alumni
Chinese television presenters
Chinese film actresses
Chinese television actresses
Chinese women television presenters